Sherraine Schalm, formerly Sherraine Schalm-MacKay (born June 21, 1975), is a former top-ranked Canadian Olympic épée fencer.  She is a World Cup medal winner, elementary school teacher and author.  She is a graduate of the University of Ottawa. At the 2005 World Fencing Championships she won a bronze medal in the individual épée event, becoming the first Canadian to ever win a World Championships medal in the sport. The next season, in 2005–06, she won the overall World Cup title.

Born in Brooks, Alberta, Schalm has earned the best ever results for any Canadian woman fencer at the world championships, the Olympic Games and is a four-time medallist at the Pan American Games. She has competed at four Summer Olympics. In 2000 she finished 19th in the individual event. In 2004 she finished 18th in the individual event, and fourth in the team event.

Schalm published a memoir, Running With Swords (under the name Sherraine MacKay), in 2005.

In the 2008 Olympic Games, Schalm was widely expected to challenge for a medal, but lost in the second round. She was seeded 9th.

At the 2012 Summer Olympics, she reached the last 32 but lost to Shin A-lam.

She retired in 2013.

Books
 

Sherraine has also won two individual world championship medals at the senior level. The four-time Olympian from Brooks, Alta., captured Canada's first world championship fencing medal – a bronze in individual épée in 2005. She topped that in 2009, claiming a silver.

References

1975 births
Living people
Canadian female fencers
Olympic fencers of Canada
Fencers at the 2000 Summer Olympics
Fencers at the 2004 Summer Olympics
Fencers at the 2007 Pan American Games
Fencers at the 2008 Summer Olympics
Fencers at the 2011 Pan American Games
Fencers at the 2012 Summer Olympics
People from Brooks, Alberta
Sportspeople from Alberta
University of Ottawa alumni
Pan American Games silver medalists for Canada
Pan American Games bronze medalists for Canada
Pan American Games medalists in fencing
Medalists at the 2011 Pan American Games